Kang Hyun-wook may refer to:

Kang Hyun-wook (politician), a South Korean politician
Kang Hyun-wook (footballer), a South Korean soccer player